Leevaku paisjärv is a lake of Estonia.

See also
List of lakes of Estonia

Reservoirs in Estonia
Räpina Parish
Lakes of Põlva County